Dr. Somervell Memorial CSI Medical College (SMC, Dr SM CSI MCH, SMCSI) is a self financing Medical College located in Karakonam, a village in the Thiruvananthapuram District of the State of Kerala. The college is attached to the Dr. Somervell Memorial Mission Hospital. It was established in 2002 and the institution is affiliated to the University of Kerala, Kerala University of Health Sciences. The Karakonam hospital is recognized as the first private hospital in the state of Kerala established in the year 1975.

The Hospital, the Medical College and all other institutions attached are run by the South Kerala Diocese of the Church of South India and managed by the South Kerala Medical Mission. The South Kerala Medical Mission is a Charitable Society registered under the Travancore Cochin Literary, Scientific and Charitable Societies Registration Act XII of 1955. The office of the South Kerala Medical Mission is in the LMS Compound, the Head Office of the CSI South Kerala Diocese

Karakonam is 30 km South (by Kanyakumari Road) from Trivandrum Central railway station, abutting the Vellarada Road from Trivandrum as well as Parassala State Transport buses and private vehicles frequently ply on the road. Dhanuvachapuram Railway station on the railway line between Trivandrum Central and Nagercoil is only 3 km from the college.

References

External links
 

Universities and colleges affiliated with the Church of South India
Private medical colleges in India
Medical colleges in Thiruvananthapuram
Colleges affiliated with the Kerala University of Health Sciences
2002 establishments in Kerala
Educational institutions established in 2002
Universities and colleges in Thiruvananthapuram district
Medical colleges in Kerala